Spacelords (previously known as Raiders of the Broken Planet) is an online free-to-play action-adventure video game developed and published by Spanish studio MercurySteam. It was released for Microsoft Windows, PlayStation 4 and Xbox One on September 22, 2017, and for PlayStation 5 and Xbox Series X/S in November 2020.

Spacelords is an asymmetric online adventure game. There are gameplay elements which task the players to shoot and brawl and utilize strategy. A story mode, which will be released episodically, is also planned.

Development
Development for the game had already begun before the release of MercurySteam's previous game, Castlevania: Lords of Shadow 2. Dave Cox, the producer of the Castlevania franchise, revealed that some of the abandoned gameplay elements for Lords of Shadow 2, such as the combat mechanics, may be featured in the company's next game. In March 2016, Cox announced his partnership with MercurySteam and that the company was working on a new game with a sci-fi setting. Enric Alvarez, the head of MercurySteam, further described the project as one of the company's most "ambitious" titles. The game was teased by MercurySteam multiple times before it was officially announced in April 2016. MercurySteam is set to self-publish Raiders of the Broken Planet for PlayStation 4, Microsoft Windows and Xbox One on September 22, 2017. A beta test for the Windows version is set to be held before the game's official release. 

On July 21, 2018, MercurySteam have announced the new name for the game as Spacelords and planned to go with Free-2-Play by giving players access to all four campaigns (a total of 16 multi-stage missions) at once, accessible in any order they choose. There will also be a new progression system, allowing players to access the game’s entire character roster. The game was also released for PlayStation 5 and Xbox Series X/S in November 2020 as a launch title for the consoles.

References

External links
 

2017 video games
Action-adventure games
Asymmetrical multiplayer video games
Free-to-play video games
Multiplayer online games
Multiplayer and single-player video games
PlayStation 4 games
PlayStation 5 games
Science fiction video games
Indie video games
Space Western video games
Video games developed in Spain
Video games set in outer space
Video games set on fictional planets
Video games with cross-platform play
Windows games
Xbox One games
Xbox Play Anywhere games
Xbox Series X and Series S games